Travis Darelle "Teddy" Walton  (born July 30, 1992, in Memphis, Tennessee) is an American record producer, songwriter and DJ. He began music production by creating songs with his older brother, June, which gained traction on SoundCloud. Teddy has gone on to produce for artists including Drake, Kendrick Lamar, Chris Brown, Travis Scott, Bryson Tiller, ASAP Rocky, Nipsey Hussle, Future, Post Malone, Schoolboy Q, Freddie Gibbs, GoldLink, Maxo Kream, Vince Staples, ASAP Ferg, and Big K.R.I.T. Walton's unique blend of trap, R&B, and hip-hop have produced records earning two Grammy Awards, multi-platinum certifications, and placements on Billboard's Hot 100 and Top 200 charts.

Early life 
Walton was born in Memphis, Tennessee and attended early years of high school in Columbia, Missouri, soon beginning production and composition of music in FL Studio after he mistakenly downloaded the music producing software thinking it was a video game. He refined his sound by creating projects with his brother, rapper June. Walton self-describes his sound as a fusion of influences from Three 6 Mafia, Tame Impala and SWV – a soulful and psychedelic blend he calls "urban epic".

In 2012, Walton and June released their first project, EVOL, which gained traction online and attracted the attention of ASAP Yams. In 2013, June and Walton followed up the project with the single "Big Pimpin" featuring Big K.R.I.T. In 2014, they released Living Colour: Chapter 1, followed by XXX - EP in 2015.

Music career 
In 2015, Walton's first major label placement came with a track off ASAP Rocky's second studio album At. Long. Last. ASAP, "Electric Body" featuring Schoolboy Q. The track was certified gold in the US and peaked at number 80 on the US Billboard Hot 100 chart.

In 2017, Walton produced Kendrick Lamar's "Love" and did additional production on "God", from Lamar's fourth studio album Damn. The album debuted at number one on the US Billboard 200 and won a Grammy for Best Rap Album. "Love" is certified 4× platinum and "God" is certified gold in the US. That same year, Walton produced GoldLink's "Crew", which became 3× platinum. Walton also produced Young Dolph's "Pacific Ocean" and four tracks off of Bryson Tiller's True to Self.

In 2018, Walton produced "King's Dead" and "Redemption" off of Kendrick Lamar's Black Panther: The Album. At the 61st Annual Grammys, "King's Dead" was nominated for Rap Song of The Year and won Lamar Rap Performance of The Year. "King's Dead" also became 3× platinum in the US. In the same year, Walton also produced Post Malone's "Spoil My Night" and Jay Rock's "ES Tales".

In 2019, Walton produced "No Guidance" by Chris Brown, featuring Drake, which became certified platinum in August 2019, less than 10 weeks following its release. The song was nominated for Best R&B song at the 62nd Annual Grammy Awards. It was later certified 5× platinum. That same year, Walton also produced DJ Khaled's "Celebrate", featuring Post Malone and Travis Scott.

In 2020, Walton was the lead composer for the original score for YOUR ATTENTION PLEASE; a Hulu short-series hosted by Craig Robinson celebrating inspiring Black voices "who are part of the next generation of excellence". He also co-produced four tracks off of Big Sean's Detroit 2 including "Wolves" with Post Malone and "Don Life" with Lil Wayne. That same year, Walton contributed additional production to "Wash Us in the Blood" by Kanye West, featuring Travis Scott. On his birthday, July 30, Walton premiered "No Love" with Young Dolph. It is the first single off his forthcoming album Mental Health. In September 2020, he produced "Franchise" for Travis Scott, Young Thug, and M.I.A., which debuted at #1 on the Billboard Top 100. Walton also produced on "Dive" by Kid Cudi and "Next To You" by Bryson Tiller.

Discography

References

External links 
 

1992 births
Living people
Musicians from Memphis, Tennessee
American male songwriters
Record producers from Tennessee
African-American DJs
21st-century American musicians
21st-century American male musicians
African-American songwriters
21st-century African-American musicians
American pop musicians
American soul musicians
American rhythm and blues musicians